Franklin is a village in Morgan County, Illinois, United States. The population was 610 at the 2010 census. It is part of the Jacksonville Micropolitan Statistical Area.

Geography

Demographics

As of the census of 2000, there were 586 people, 226 households, and 169 families residing in the village. The racial makeup of the village was 98.98% White, 0.68% Native American, and 0.34% from two or more races. Hispanic or Latino of any race were 0.85% of the population.

There were 226 households, out of which 41.2% had children under the age of 18 living with them, 60.2% were married couples living together, 9.3% had a female householder with no husband present, and 24.8% were non-families. 18.1% of all households were made up of individuals, and 10.2% had someone living alone who was 65 years of age or older. the average household size was 2.59 and the average family size was 2.98.

In the village, the population was spread out, with 29.4% under the age of 18, 8.5% from 18 to 24, 29.9% from 25 to 44, 21.2% from 45 to 64, and 11.1% who were 65 years of age or older. the median age was 36 years. for every 100 females, there were 98.0 males. for every 100 females age 18 and over, there were 95.3 males.

The median income for a household in the village was $39,375, and the median income for a family was $47,813. males had a median income of $35,000 versus $21,923 for females. the per capita income for the village was $16,327. about 6.1% of families and 8.6% of the population were below the poverty line, including 5.9% of those under age 18 and 15.5% of those age 65 or over.

Education
Franklin Community Unit School District #1 provides education to the village and surrounding area.

References

Villages in Morgan County, Illinois
Villages in Illinois
Jacksonville, Illinois micropolitan area